Philipp Sander (born 21 February 1998) is a German professional footballer who plays as a midfielder for  club Holstein Kiel.

Career
Sander made his professional debut for Holstein Kiel in the 2. Bundesliga on 23 December 2018, coming on as a substitute in the 90+2nd minute for Kingsley Schindler in the 3–1 home win against Hamburger SV.

He joined 3. Liga side SC Verl on loan for the 2020–21 season.

References

External links
 
 

1998 births
Living people
Sportspeople from Rostock
German footballers
Association football midfielders
Holstein Kiel II players
Holstein Kiel players
SC Verl players
2. Bundesliga players
Regionalliga players